Van Aanholt is a surname. Notable people with the surname include:

Cor van Aanholt (born 1959), Dutch Antillean sailor
Patrick van Aanholt (born 1990), Dutch footballer
Philipine van Aanholt (born 1992), Curaçaoan sailor
Odile van Aanholt (born 1998), Dutch sailor

Dutch-language surnames
Surnames of Dutch origin